The F-Cell is a hydrogen fuel cell electric vehicle developed by Daimler AG. Two different versions are known - the previous version was based on the Mercedes-Benz A-Class, and the new model is based on the Mercedes-Benz B-Class. This improvement in range is due in part to the B-Class's greater space for holding tanks of compressed hydrogen, higher storage pressure, as well as fuel cell technology advances. Both cars have made use of a "sandwich" design concept, aimed at maximizing room for both passengers and the propulsion components. The fuel cell is a proton exchange membrane fuel cell (PEMFC), designed by the Automotive Fuel Cell Cooperation (AFCC) Corporation.

There are 60 F-Cell vehicles leased to customers in the USA, Europe, Singapore and Japan.

Production
In December 2010, began its B-Class based F-Cell lease program with the first delivery to Vince Van Patten, with a further 69 to be on the roads in California by 2010.

Hydrogen storage
The 350 Bar (5000 PSI) hydrogen tanks for hydrogen storage contain enough fuel for a  drive.

Notable publicity
 On May 23, 2006, Daimler announced that its fuel cell vehicle fleets had achieved a combined mileage of over 2 million kilometers (1.24 million miles).
 On May 31, 2006, Daimler revealed that select individuals in California would be able to take their driving examination in an F-Cell.
 On July 6, 2006, Daimler leased 1 F-Cell to DHL Japan as delivery car in Tokyo area.
 On January 30, 2011, three F-Cell vehicles start on a 125-day long-lasting journey around the world.
 On June 21, 2011, Daimler announced it was moving up commercialization of the B-Class F-CELL to 2014
 On Jan 31, 2014 YouTube video uploaded of new F-cell fuel cell, no information known otherwise.

Recognition
The Mercedes-Benz B-Class F-Cell was selected by Green Car Journal as one of the five finalists to the 2012 Green Car Vision Award.

Gallery

See also

List of fuel cell vehicles

References

External links
 Road test on USAtoday.com
 News on the German Chancellor taking delivery of an F-Cell
 Driving Impression by Tom Bird of Channel4 - Website is now defunct, so this link uses the Wayback Machine
 UCLA-Driving the F-Cell
 Mercedes-Benz Leasing (in German)
 Mercedes-Benz B-Class F-CELL

Hydrogen cars
Fuel cell vehicles
F-Cell